Podpiwek is a Polish and Lithuanian non-alcoholic beverage (even though it contains a small amount of alcohol, about 0.5%).

It is usually made from grain coffee, hops, yeast, water and sugar, which undergo fermentation.

Often created as a byproduct during beer production, it was a common drink of women and children.

Famous brands

 Podpiwek kujawski
 Podpiwek Jędrzej
 Podpiwek Lubuski
 Podpiwek Obołoń
 Podpiwek warmiński

See also 

 Kvass
 Hardaliye
 Malt beer

References

References

Non-alcoholic drinks
Polish drinks
Fermented drinks
Soft drinks
Lithuanian drinks